UnitedHealthcare Pro Cycling Women's Team is a professional Women's road bicycle racing team, run by Momentum Sports Group and based in the United States. The team is sponsored principally by UnitedHealth Group. The team's most notable signing is the 2013 Giro Rosa overall winner Mara Abbott. The team made its debut at the inaugural Tour Femenino de San Luis.

The team disbanded at the end of the 2018 season.

Team history

2014

Riders in
On September 9, 2014, it was reported that Linda Villumsen will join the team for the 2015 season. On October 27 the team signed Laura Brown and Abigail Mickey. Ruth Winder, Scotti Wilborne, Lauren Tamayo, Alexis Ryan, Coryn Rivera, Cari Higgins, Katie Hall, Rushlee Buchanan and Hannah Barnes signed contract extensions.

Riders out
On October 23, 2014, Alison Powers announced her retirement from the sport.

Team roster

Previous squads

2016

2015
As of 10 March 2015. Ages as of 1 January 2015.

2014

Major wins

2014
 Overall Tour Femenino de San Luis, Alison Powers
 Combination classification, Alison Powers
Teams classification
Stage 1, Hannah Barnes
Stage 3, Alison Powers
Grand Prix de Oriente, Mara Abbott
 Overall Vuelta a El Salvador, Mara Abbott
Stage 4, Mara Abbott
 Overall Tour of the Gila, Mara Abbott
Teams classification
Stages 1 & 5, Mara Abbott
Stage 4, Alison Powers
 Mountains classification The Women's Tour, Sharon Laws
Women's Tour of California time trial, Alison Powers
Blue Dome Criterium (NCC), Hannah Barnes
Brady Arts District Criterium (NCC), Hannah Barnes
River Parks Criterium (NCC), Coryn Rivera
River Parks Omnium (NCC), Coryn Rivera
Sprints classification North Star Grand Prix (NCC), Coryn Rivera
Stage 1 (ITT), Alison Powers
Stages 2 & 4, Coryn Rivera
Utah Cedar City Grand Prix, Alison Powers
Tour of Utah Women's edition, Coryn Rivera
Tour de Lafayette, Coryn Rivera
Tour de Francis Park, Coryn Rivera
Giro della Montagna, Coryn Rivera
Gateway Cup, Hannah Barnes
TD Bank Mayor's Cup, Coryn Rivera
2015
Milton Track Championships (Team Pursuit), Laura Brown
Gran Prix San Luis Femenino, Hannah Barnes
 Mountains classification Tour Femenino de San Luis, Katie Hall
 Young rider classification, Hannah Barnes
Stages 1 & 2, Hannah Barnes
Stage 5, Katie Hall
Sunny King Criterium, Hannah Barnes
Novant Health Invitational Criterium, Hannah Barnes
Stages 4 & 5 Redlands Bicycle Classic, Coryn Rivera
Stage 3 Joe Martin Stage Race, Coryn Rivera
Stage 4 Joe Martin Stage Race, Scotti Wilborne
Stage 4 Tour of the Gila, Hannah Barnes
Stage 1 Tour of California, Katie Hall
Armed Forces Association Cycling Classic, Coryn Rivera
Crystal Cup, Coryn Rivera
Stage 6 Tour of America's Dairyland, Cari Higgins
Stage 5 Women's Tour, Hannah Barnes
Stage 5 Thüringen Rundfahrt der Frauen, Coryn Rivera
Stage 6 Thüringen Rundfahrt der Frauen, Katie Hall
2016
 Overall Tour Femenino de San Luis, Katie Hall
 Mountains classification, Katie Hall
Stage 5, Katie Hall
 Overall Joe Martin Stage Race, Coryn Rivera
Stage 1 (ITT), Linda Villumsen
Stage 2, Coryn Rivera
2017
 Overall Joe Martin Stage Race, Ruth Winder
 Young rider classification, Janelle Cole
Stages 1 (ITT) & 4, Ruth Winder
 Overall Tour of the Gila, Tayler Wiles
 Mountains classification, Katie Hall
 Young rider classification, Ruth Winder
Team classification
Stages 1 & 5, Katie Hall
 Overall Redlands Bicycle Classic, Ruth Winder
Stage 2, Katie Hall
Stage 5, Ruth Winder
Stage 2 Clasica 20 de Julio, Diana Peñuela
Stage 1 Vuelta a Colombia Femenina, Diana Peñuela
 Mountains classification Tour of California, Katie Hall
Teams classification
Stage 2, Katie Hall
 Overall Tour de Feminin-O cenu Českého Švýcarska, Ruth Winder
 Points classification, Ruth Winder
 Mountains classification, Tayler Wiles
Team classification
Stages 1 & 2, Ruth Winder
 Mountains classification Thüringen Rundfahrt der Frauen, Tayler Wiles
 Active rider classification Stage 2, Tayler Wiles
Stage 5, Tayler Wiles
Stage 1 Vuelta a Colombia Femenina, Diana Peñuela
2018
Stage 1 (ITT) Valley of the Sun, Leah Thomas
Stage 2 Valley of the Sun, Lauren Hall
Stage 2 Vuelta al Valle del Cauca, Diana Peñuela
Clásica a Zarzal, Diana Peñuela
 Overall Joe Martin Stage Race, Katie Hall
Team classification
Stage 1, Diana Peñuela
Stage 3 (ITT), Katie Hall
 Overall Tour of the Gila, Katie Hall
Stage 1, Katie Hall
Stage 5, Diana Peñuela
 Overall Redlands Bicycle Classic, Katie Hall
Stage 2, Katie Hall
 Overall Tour of California, Katie Hall
 Mountains classification, Katie Hall
Team classification
Stage 2, Katie Hall
Grand Prix Cycliste de Gatineau, Lauren Hall
 Overall Tour de Feminin-O cenu Českého Švýcarska, Leah Thomas
 Mountains classification, Katie Hall
Team classification
Stage 3 (ITT), Lauretta Hanson
Chrono Champenois, Leah Thomas

National and world champions

2014
 New Zealand Road Race, Rushlee Buchanan
 USA Time Trial, Alison Powers
 USA Road Race, Alison Powers
 USA Criterium, Coryn Rivera
 New Zealand Criterium, Rushlee Buchanan
2015
 Canada Track (Team Pursuit), Laura Brown
 New Zealand Road Race, Linda Villumsen
 World Time Trial, Linda Villumsen
2016
 New Zealand Time Trial, Rushlee Buchanan
 New Zealand Road Race, Rushlee Buchanan
 USA Criterium, Lauren Tamayo
 British Time Trial, Hayley Simmonds
2017
 New Zealand Road Race, Rushlee Buchanan
 New Zealand Track (Team Pursuit), Rushlee Buchanan
 New Zealand Track (Points Race), Rushlee Buchanan
 New Zealand Criterium, Rushlee Buchanan
 Oceania Track (Team Pursuit), Rushlee Buchanan
2018
 Oceania Track (Team Pursuit), Rushlee Buchanan

See also
 UnitedHealthcare Pro Cycling (men's team)

References

UCI Women's Teams
Cycling teams based in the United States
Women's sports teams in the United States
Cycling teams established in 2014
2014 establishments in the United States
Cycling teams disestablished in 2018
2018 disestablishments in the United States